Doblemente embarazada may refer to:

 Doblemente embarazada (2019 film), a Mexican comedy film
 Doblemente embarazada (2021 film), a Peruvian comedy film, a remake of the above